Obory  is a village in the administrative district of Gmina Konstancin-Jeziorna, within Piaseczno County, Masovian Voivodeship, in east-central Poland.

External links
 Jewish Community in Obory on Virtual Shtetl

References

Obory